Neuenhof is a railway station in the municipality of Neuenhof in the Swiss canton of Aargau. The station is located on the Zürich–Baden railway.

The station is served by service S12 of the Zurich S-Bahn.

References 

Railway stations in the canton of Aargau
Swiss Federal Railways stations
Railway stations in Switzerland opened in 1990